Fort William railway station is a railway station serving the town of Fort William in the Highland region of Scotland. It is on the West Highland line, between Spean Bridge and Banavie, measured  from Craigendoran Junction, at the southern end of the line near Helensburgh. The station is operated by ScotRail, who operate most services from the station, as well as Caledonian Sleeper, and The Jacobite, an excursion operated by West Coast Railways.

History 

The first station was constructed by the West Highland Railway which was later absorbed by the North British Railway. They chose a site for the station alongside the town shipping pier, which required the purchase of a strip of the foreshore. The railway company bought this for £25 an acre. Purchase of this land displaced some people from their houses and the railway company was obliged to provide replacement housing. Other residents realised too late that the railway line cut the town off from the shore and the company responded by providing some wicket gate crossings.

It was opened by the Marchioness of Tweedale, Candida Louisa Bartolucci, wife of the chairman of the North British Railway, William Hay, 10th Marquess of Tweeddale 
on 7 August 1894. They had departed by special train comprising two locomotives and eleven carriages from Glasgow at 8.15am, and arrived in Fort William at 1.30pm. It was sited further west of the present station on what is now the A82 town by-pass alongside Loch Linnhe at Station Square, at the time in close proximity to then location of the former Caledonian MacBrayne bus station. The old station was a stone built construction featuring a turret and a double arched entranceway and had three platforms. Two of the platforms terminated under the platform canopy, but the third continued past the station, crossing the MacBrayne pier and terminated at the jetty just beyond. 

The last train from the old station departed on 7 June 1975 and the station closed on 9 June. It was demolished immediately afterwards to permit construction of the bypass.

The present Fort William station of grey concrete construction was opened on 13 June 1975. The current station lies in the shadow of Ben Nevis.

Accidents and incidents 
During high winds in February 1980 a brick wall at the station collapsed onto the track and blocked a platform.

Signalling 
Since its opening in 1975, the present Fort William station has been equipped with colour light signals. The signalling is controlled from an 'NX' (entrance-exit) panel in Fort William Junction signal box. The single line between the junction and the station is worked by the Track Circuit Block system, so no tokens are needed for that part of the route.

Facilities 
Refurbishment of the facilities at Fort William railway station was completed in 2007 thanks to a £750,000 investment. The refurbishment includes new shower facilities and refurbished toilets. The shower facilities include two showers for ladies, two for gentlemen and one unisex shower facility for disabled people.

The island platform is also equipped with a few shops and restaurants, a ticket office, bike racks, a car park and a taxi rank, and some benches. All areas of the station are step-free.

Passenger volume 

The statistics cover twelve month periods that start in April.

Services 

There is also a daily early morning service to Mallaig that starts at Fort William, with a similar return service in the evening, which connects with the Caledonian Sleeper. The regular Sunday service consists of two train per day each way between Glasgow and Mallaig, with the schedule in the peak season supplemented by one service between Fort William and Mallaig.

The sleeper also carries seated coaches and can thus be used as a regular service train to/from Glasgow Queen Street and Edinburgh Waverley.

The Jacobite operates non-stop between Fort William and Mallaig. This runs all year round, with a maximum of two trains per day Monday to Saturday and one on Sunday. A reduced Jacobite timetable is operated later in the summer.

See also 
 West Highland Railway

References

Bibliography

External links 

 
 
 

Railway stations in Highland (council area)
Railway stations in Great Britain opened in 1894
Former North British Railway stations
Railway stations in Great Britain closed in 1975
Railway stations opened by British Rail
Railway stations in Great Britain opened in 1975
Railway stations served by ScotRail
Railway stations served by Caledonian Sleeper
Fort William, Highland